Ibaan, officially the Municipality of Ibaan,  is a 2nd class municipality in the province of Batangas, Philippines. According to the 2020 census, it has a population of 58,507 people.

It is bounded on the northwest by San Jose, the northeast by Lipa City, the east by Rosario, the southeast by Taysan, and the southwest by Batangas City.

It is a predominantly Roman Catholic community, with small percentages of Protestants and members of the Iglesia ni Cristo. Tagalog is the local language in the Batangueño dialect; however, English is included in its educational curriculum and is often used in official dealings and transactions.

Temperature is moderate both in its rainy and dry seasons, conducive to farming, agricultural and livestock production, which are the most common occupations. There are fewer farmers each year as residents switch to hog-raising, which provides better income.

Ibaan is known as the home of the "kulambo" (mosquito net), as its production and trading has become one of the most profitable businesses in the locality. Ibaan is also known for its  tamales that are wrapped in banana leaves.

The town celebrates its foundation day every February 11, with a simple festival called "Les Kuhliembo Festival", featuring their products: tamales, kulambo, habi, liempo, and tubo (sugar cane).

Geography

According to the Philippine Statistics Authority, the municipality has a land area of  constituting  of the  total area of Batangas.

Barangays
Ibaan is politically subdivided into 26 barangays. Bungahan was constituted as a barrio in 1956.

Climate

Demographics

In the 2020 census, Ibaan had a population of 58,507.

Religion
Ibaan is home to the Saint James the Greater Parish, the seat of the Roman Catholic in Ibaan, which is the oldest church in town.

The indigenous Iglesia ni Cristo has several locales in the town, including the chapels in Coliat and Matala.

Economy

Ibaan main products include tamales, kulambo (mosquito net), lomi, panutsa (sweet peanut), and sugarcane.

Culture

Festivals
Ibaan celebrates civic and national holidays. The Ibaan Foundation Day is celebrated every December to commemorate the city's founding. Each barangay also has its own festivity guided by their patron saint. The town is host to the Feast of Saint James the Greater, held every 25 July, which draws hundreds of Catholic devotees. Another religious feasts held in Ibaan was the Procession Feast of Holy week. Non-religious holidays include the New Year's Day, National Heroes' Day, Bonifacio Day, and Rizal Day.

Sports
Most barangays have a makeshift basketball court, with court markings drawn on the roads. Larger barangays have covered courts where interbarangay leagues are held every summer (April to May).

The town has several well-known sports venues, such as the Bro. Medrano Plaza and Recto Gymnasium, the home of the now defunct Ibaan Basketball Team. The Bro. Medrano Plaza, which houses the basketball and volleyball courts, had hosted several multi-sport events and games.

Other well-known sports facilities include the Recto Gym, operated by the local government, and the Fr. Guido Colletti Gym, a private venue owned by Saint James Academy.

Education
Elementary schools and high schools include.

 Dr. Juan A. Pastor Memorial National High School
 Maximo T. Hernandez Memorial National High School
 BUNGAHAN ELEMENTARY SCHOOL
 Balanga Elementary School
 Coliat Elementary School
 Ibaan Central School
 Lucsuhin Elementary School
 Mabalor-Catandala Elementary School
 Malainin Elementary School
 Munting Tubig Elementary School (Gregorio Sison Memorial Elementary School)
 Palindan Elementary School
 Quilo Elementary School
 Sabang Elementary school
 San Agustin Elementary School
 Santo Niño Elementary School
 Talaibon Elementary School
 Tulay-Calamias Elementary School

Ibaan has private schools, mostly Catholic or Christian:

 Acts Christian Academy
 Ibaan Nazareth School
 Marfeben Academy
 Our Lady of Grace Formation School
 Ibaan Saint James Academy Inc.
 St. Jude Science and Technological School of Ibaan Inc.

Gallery

References

External links

[ Philippine Standard Geographic Code]

Municipalities of Batangas